The 1975 NCAA Division II football rankings are from United Press International and from Associated Press. The 1975 NCAA Division II football season was the first year UPI published a Division II poll. 1975 was also the 16th (and last) year AP published a "College Division" poll.

The final UPI poll was released before the Division II playoffs, and the final AP poll was released after the playoffs.

Legend

The AP poll

The UPI poll

Notes

References

Rankings
NCAA College Division football rankings
NCAA Division II football rankings